The Night They Took Miss Beautiful is a 1977 American made-for-television drama film appearing on the NBC network that was produced by Don Kirshner. The film features a large number of stars in a story about "skyjacking beauty queens" on a Consolidated PBY Catalina. The passengers include five beauty pageant contestants, their entourage, and a secret agent carrying a vial of a secret and highly fatal biological warfare toxin that if opened can cause a pandemic.

Plot
Following a Miss Universe-style contest in Miami, Florida, the five semi-finalists are flown to Nassau, Bahamas in a flying boat along with the American contestant's stage mother; the group's escort, Kate Malloy (Stella Stevens); Miss Beautiful Master of Ceremonies Marv Barker (Phil Silvers) and a deadheading pilot, Paul Fabiani (Gary Collins).

At the airport, no one notices two men in flight mechanic's coveralls board the aircraft and conceal themselves. The two, members of a Symbionese Liberation Army-type revolutionary terrorist group, hijack the aircraft, killing the co-pilot when he attempts to send a warning over the radio. The surviving pilot lowers the aircraft to 200 feet to avoid radar and lands on a small uninhabited island that has World War II-vintage buildings. What the two terrorists do not know is that a deadly contagious nerve agent is aboard.

Awaiting the kidnapped passengers is Layla Burden (Sheree North), de facto leader of the terrorists who will kill the captives one by one until a $5 million ransom is paid.

Back at the small Miami airport the flying boat left from, security manager Mike O'Toole (Chuck Connors) meets two government agents, who are not from the Federal Bureau of Investigation but from an unnamed government agency with higher authority.  The two agents are accompanied by several soldiers wearing American combat uniforms without insignia carrying automatic weapons.

Mike is shocked that the government agents not only have no intention of paying the ransom, but will instead get a fix on their position from the next radio transmission of their demands and launch an airstrike to kill the lot of them, including the hostages. Mike concludes that the captive's only hope rests with him.

Cast

 Chuck Connors as  Mike O'Toole  
 Gary Collins as Paul Fabiani  
 Henry Gibson as Rolly Royce  
 Peter Haskell as Damon Faulkner  
 Karen Lamm  as Cindy Lou Barrett  
 Sheree North as Layla Burden  
 Victoria Principal as Reba Bar Lev, Miss Israel  
 Gregory Sierra as Omar Welk  
 Phil Silvers as Marv Barker  
 Stella Stevens as Kate Malloy  
 Rosanne Katon as April Garland, Miss Virgin Islands 
 Jonathan Banks  as Buck  
 William Bassett as Smitty  
 Marcia Lewis as Mrs. Barrett  
 Burke Byrnes as Barney Jessup
 Paul Kent as Director

Production
The Night They Took Miss Beautiful featured a Consolidated PBY Catalina, a flying boat that dates back to the 1930s and 1940s. It was used as a patrol, reconnaissance and night bomber during World War II.

Reception
The Night They Took Miss Beautiful was not critically reviewed, but People in its "Picks and Pans" review was succinct: "Terrorists hold a planeload of beauty pageant finalists for ransom in this TV movie starring Phil Silvers, Stella Stevens, Sheree North and Chuck Connors. Better they should keep them."

In a later 2007 DVD release, The Night They Took Miss Beautiful was bundled with The Woman Hunter, a 1972 made-for-television mystery film.

References

Notes

Bibliography

 Taylor, Tadhg. Masters of the Shoot-'Em-Up: Conversations With Directors, Actors and Writers of Vintage Action Movies and Television Shows. Jefferson, North Carolina: McFarland & Company, 2015. .

External links
 

1977 television films
1977 films
1977 drama films
American aviation films
Films about aircraft hijackings
Films about aviation accidents or incidents
Films set in the Caribbean
Films set in Miami
Films set on airplanes
Films about beauty pageants
American drama television films
1970s English-language films
Films directed by Robert Michael Lewis
1970s American films